The Winfield Formation is a geologic formation in Nebraska. It preserves fossils dating back to the Permian period.

See also

 List of fossiliferous stratigraphic units in Nebraska
 Paleontology in Nebraska

References
 

Permian geology of Nebraska
Permian Kansas
Permian geology of Oklahoma